The Cryptocephalinae are a subfamily  of the leaf beetles (Chrysomelidae), and belong to the group of case-bearing leaf beetles called the Camptosomata.

The tribes Fulcidacini and Clytrini were formerly considered subfamilies of their own, and are presently treated only as tribes. Species in at least 14 genera of Clytrini and Cryptocephalini are myrmecophilous, living with ants.

References

External links
 Key to the British genera of Cryptocephalinae

 
Taxa named by Leonard Gyllenhaal
Beetle subfamilies